Alessandra Lari (born 25 April 1985) is an Italian professional racing cyclist. She rides for the S.C. Michela Fanini Rox team.

See also
 List of 2015 UCI Women's Teams and riders

References

External links
 

1985 births
Living people
Italian female cyclists
People from Pistoia
Sportspeople from the Province of Pistoia
Cyclists from Tuscany